Kenneth Edgar Mylne Barker (27 October 1877 – 6 August 1938) was an English first-class cricketer active 1898–99 who played for Surrey and Cambridge University. He was born in Godstone; died in Blakeney, Norfolk.

During the First World War Barker was commissioned into the Cambridgeshire Regiment of the British Army.

References

1877 births
1938 deaths
English cricketers
Surrey cricketers
Cambridge University cricketers
Cambridgeshire Regiment officers
Marylebone Cricket Club cricketers
British Army personnel of World War I
Military personnel from Surrey